Base General Bernardo O'Higgins Riquelme, also Base Libertador General Bernardo O'Higgins Riquelme, or shortly Bernardo O'Higgins, named after Bernardo O'Higgins, is a permanently staffed Chilean research station in Antarctica and the capital of Antártica Commune. It lies at an elevation of 13 m, about 30 km south-west of Prime Head, the northernmost point of the Antarctic Peninsula, at Cape Legoupil.

History
The base was established on 18 February 1948 by the Chilean Antarctic Expedition, and is one of the Antarctic bases with the longest times of continuous operation. The winter population is 24, and the peak population in the Antarctic summer is usually 52, although up to 60 persons can be accommodated. The base is operated by the Chilean Army. It is also known as Puerto Covadonga after the port on which it is located.

The German Antarctic Receiving Station (GARS) was established at O'Higgins in 1991 by the DLR.  It is a satellite ground station sited in Antarctica to enable reception of data from satellite-based sensors within the south polar region that might otherwise be lost.  High bandwidth sensors such as SAR generate too much data to be stored on board the satellite for transmission to ground stations elsewhere.  GARS was sited at O'Higgins because of the geology, infrastructure and accessibility of the base.

Three dozen COVID-19 cases were reported on the research base on December 22, 2020. These are the first reported cases on the continent.

Historic site
The O’Higgins Historic Site on Cape Legoupil comprises structures of historical significance:
 The original base was established on 18 February 1948 by the President of the Republic of Chile, Gabriel González Videla, the first head of state in the world to visit Antarctica.
 The Capitán General Bernardo O ́Higgins Riquelme Bust was erected in 1948 opposite the base.
 A plaque was erected on 12 August 1957 in memory of Lieutenants Oscar Inostroza Contreras and Sergio Ponce Torrealba.
 The Virgen del Carmen Grotto, near the base, was built in the early 1970s to serve as a place of spiritual withdrawal for the staff of various Antarctic stations and expeditions.

It was designated a Historic Site or Monument (HSM 37), following a proposal by Chile to the Antarctic Treaty Consultative Meeting.

Climate
Bernardo O'Higgins Base experiences a borderline polar tundra climate (Köppen ET) that is extremely close to a polar ice cap climate (Köppen EF).

See also

 List of Antarctic research stations
 List of Antarctic field camps
 Airports in Antarctica

Notes

References

External links
 Base General Bernardo O'Higgins
 Official website Instituto Antartico Chileno
The O'Higgins Penguin Webcam (gentoo penguins; seasonal)
 Antarktis Station, a personal website about life at GARS O'Higgins.
 COMNAP Antarctic Facilities
 COMNAP Antarctic Facilities Map

Outposts of Antarctica
Chilean Antarctic Territory
Earth stations in Antarctica
1948 establishments in Antarctica
Historic Sites and Monuments of Antarctica